The National Crime Scene Cleanup Association (also commonly referred to as NCSCA) is an American company, owned by Prestige Worldwide Ind Corp., that provides crime scene cleanup, hoarding cleanup training, trauma cleanup training, unattended death cleanup training, as well as various types of remediation service training, such as mold, tear gas, or methamphetamine laboratories. Their crime scene cleaners are licensed professionals. National Crime Scene Cleanup Association is headquartered out of Patchogue, NY, as well as holding various satellite offices throughout the continental United States.

Virtual reality educational software 
In June 2016, National Crime Scene Cleanup Association publicly announced plans surrounding their new educational experience, SafeGuard. Safeguard is a virtual reality educational experience designed to teach the public about the hazards and outline the details, equipment, and tools used in a typical crime scene remediation. Users navigate around a virtual crime scene and can interact and learn about various info points that show up near objects of interest. National Crime Scene Cleanup Association launched a new site to provide screenshots and updates on when the software would release.

National Crime Scene Cleanup Association also followed up with a new initiative following a few months after the announcement of Safeguard. This new initiative, dubbed 'STVR', is planned on being a virtual reality safety training course. Using the same concepts of interactivity and learning, STVR is being developed to be a safer alternative to standard 'textbook' learning, and provide more hands on learning without the risks that are normally associated with handling or working near hazardous materials and situations. STVR will not only focus on crime scene hazards training but will also cover a wide array of scenarios and situations ranging from standard OSHA hazards to dealing with toxic chemicals spills. STVR is being targeted for use by hospitals and companies to train future professionals, nurses, rescue and hazmat workers.

Ebola in New York City 
During the Ebola crisis in New York City, the National Crime Scene Cleanup Association provided support to the Bio Recovery Corporation crew, in the decontamination of Craig Spencer's apartment. Bio Recovery Corporation was hired to disinfect and clean the apartment, as well as the bowling alley, The Gutter, that Dr Spencer visited while diagnosed with Ebola. James Michel, at the time President of NCSCA, appeared with Sal Pane on news networks as consultants.

Air chemical testing 
In November 2015, it was announced that the National Crime Scene Cleanup Association, along with scientist J. Marvin Herndon and documentary filmmaker, Michael J. Murphy, were to set out in 2016 to obtain test samples from the phenomenon known as 'Chem Trails'. The testing requires a pair of pilots from the National Crime Scene Cleanup Association, to fly up in powered paragliders, and use testing equipment to determine the presence of any unnatural chemicals or pathogens. All tests were to be verified by Dr Herndon, as well as documented by Michael J. Murphy, to be released as a feature at a later date.

Initial public offering 
In March 2016, National Crime Scene Cleanup Association's parent company, Prestige Worldwide Group, announced that they would begin receiving an initial public offering on NCSCA. This was after Prestige Worldwide Group acquired three crime scene cleanup firms. These new additions increased National Crime Scene Cleanup Association's reach and resources.

In the media 
In February 2017, National Crime Scene Cleanup Association company appeared on an episode of The Guardians on Animal Planet. In the episode, the National Crime Scene Cleanup Association assisted the cast and crew of the show in the remediation of a cat hoarding veteran who lived in the woods. Workers donated their time and equipment to convert the veterans living area into a hospitable one, and helped captured the feral cats so they could be spayed and neutered.

The Alec Baldwin Shooting Cleanup (2021) 
The National Crime Scene Cleanup Association was hired to clean up after the Rust (2021) shooting incident. The crew was hired to remove the biohazards from the church on the Bonanza Creek Ranch in Bonanza City, New Mexico, just 13 miles southwest of Santa Fe, New Mexico. It is considered one of their most notable cleanups to date.

References 

Crime
Cleaning companies of the United States
Companies based in Suffolk County, New York